Nathaniel Bacon may refer to:

Sir Nathaniel Bacon of Stiffkey (died 1622), lawyer and MP for Norfolk, half-brother of Francis Bacon
Nathaniel Bacon (painter) (1585–1627), landowner and painter, nephew of Francis Bacon
Nathaniel Bacon (English politician) (1593–1660), Member of Parliament representing Cambridge University and Ipswich
Nathaniel Bacon (Jesuit) (1598–1676), Secretary of the Society of Jesus (in Rome), 1674–1676
Nathaniel Bacon (Virginia politician) (c. 1620–1692), first cousin of Virginia rebel (see next), president of Virginia's upper house (Governor's Council), plantation owner of Cheatham Annex, and a colonel
Nathaniel Bacon (Virginia colonist) (1647–1676), first cousin of Virginia president (see previous), member of Virginia's lower house (House of Burgesses), plantation owner, and instigator of Bacon's Rebellion in 1676
Nathaniel Bacon (Michigan jurist) (1802–1869), member of the Michigan Supreme Court, 1855–1857